All Aboard America! Holdings is an American bus company. It is the fourth-largest motorcoach operator in the United States and Canada. It operates charters, tours, casino and cruise shuttles, and scheduled routes.

All Aboard America! was formed in 1936 under the name Industrial Bus Lines. It served Texas and the southwest. In 2012, the private equity firm Celerity Partners acquired All Aboard America and Calco Hotard of New Orleans. In 2014, All Aboard America! acquired Sun Diego Charter of San Diego. In 2015, All Aboard America! acquired the paratransit operator for Denver's Regional Transportation District and the Denver operations of Horizon Coach Lines, which was renamed Ace Express Coaches. In 2016, All Aboard America! was acquired by Tensile Capital Partners. In 2018, All Aboard America! acquired the California company Lux Bus America. In 2020, All Aboard America! acquired First Class Transportation, a Texas carrier.

Scheduled services
All Aboard America! Holdings operates the following scheduled services:
All Aboard America!
Midland/Odessa, Texas to Presidio, Texas
NMDOT Park and Ride (under contract to New Mexico Department of Transportation)
Rio Metro buses, mainly those in Sandoval County (under contract to Rio Metro Regional Transportation District)
Ace Express Coaches
Bustang (under contract to the Colorado Department of Transportation)

References

External links

Ace Express Coaches
All Aboard Transit Services
Calco Hotard
Sun Diego Charter

Bus companies of the United States
1936 establishments in the United States